The Penrith Panthers 1967 season is the Penrith Panthers 1st first-grade season. The club competes in Australasia's NSWRFL. The coach of the team is Leo Trevena.

Regular season

Ladder

References

External links
 Panthers official site

Penrith Panthers seasons
Penrith Panthers season
Penrith Panthers season